The following is a list of Sites of Special Scientific Interest in the Banff and Buchan Area of Search. For other areas, see List of SSSIs by Area of Search.

 Bullers of Buchan Coast
 Cairnbulg to St Combs Coast
 Cullen to Stakeness Coast
 Gamrie and Pennan Coast
 Geordie Craigs
 Gight Woods
 Hill of Longhaven
 Kirkhill
 Loch of Strathbeg
 Moss of Crombie
 Moss of Cruden
 Philorth Valley
 Reidside Moss
 Rora Moss
 Rosehearty to Fraserburgh Coast
 Tore of Troup
 Turclossie Moss
 Wartle Moss
 Whitehills to Melrose Coast
 Windy Hills

 
Banff and Buchan